The 2016 Dunedin mayoral election was held on Saturday, 8 October 2016 and was conducted under the single transferable voting system. Dave Cull, Dunedin's 57th mayor, was re-elected after seeing off ten challengers.

Results 
Cull was re-elected, defeating centre-right challenger Lee Vandervis in the tenth and final iteration of votes; however, Cull's first preference vote was severely reduced.

References

Politics of Dunedin
2016
2016 elections in New Zealand
2010s in Dunedin